Anthony Gerard "Tony" Crutchfield (born May 3, 1960) is a retired United States Army lieutenant general who was the deputy commander of United States Pacific Command from 2014 to 2017, having previously served as its chief of staff from 2012 to 2014. An aviation officer by branch, Crutchfield served in several aviation commands throughout his career, culminating in command of the United States Army Aviation Center of Excellence and Fort Rucker from 2010 to 2012. As USAACE commander, he was responsible for the training, doctrine, organizational structure, and future technology development for 90,000 aviation soldiers and over 4,000 aircraft. He retired on April 7, 2017 after 34 years of distinguished service.

He now serves as Vice President for Army Systems - Defense, Space and Security Government Operations for The Boeing Company, joining the company in July 2017.

Military career and education

Crutchfield earned his commission in 1982 from the ROTC program at Marshall University. He later earned a M.A. degree in Business Administration from Webster University and a M.S. degree in strategic studies from the Army War College. Since 1986, he has been a pilot of the AH-64 Apache. Units he served with in his early career include 7th Squadron, 17th Cavalry Regiment; 1st Squadron, 6th Cavalry Regiment; and 1st Battalion, 227th Aviation Regiment.

As a field officer, Crutchfield commanded 1st Battalion, 2nd Aviation Regiment from 1998 to 2000 before proceeding to the Army War College to pass the bar for promotion to colonel. He was deployed to Afghanistan as commander of the Combat Aviation Brigade, 10th Mountain Division in 2003, remaining in the region until the brigade returned to Fort Drum in 2004. He then served as executive officer to the Deputy Commanding General and Chief of Staff, U.S. Army Training and Doctrine Command from 2004 to 2007 and then as Deputy Commander and Chief of Staff, U.S. Army Accessions Command from 2007 to 2008.

Brigadier General Crutchfield assumed command of the United States Army Aviation Center of Excellence and Fort Rucker from James O. Barclay III on August 19, 2010, leading the center until August 10, 2012 when he relinquished command to Kevin W. Mangum. He was promoted to major general on February 3, 2011, with his family and former mentor, retired three-star general Thomas F. Metz in attendance.

After two years as chief of staff of United States Pacific Command (USPACOM), Crutchfield was promoted to lieutenant general in a ceremony at Fort Rucker and became deputy commander of PACOM on June 6, 2014.

Crutchfield retired on April 7, 2017 after 34 years of distinguished service. His retirement ceremony was hosted by then Vice Chief of Staff of the United States Army Daniel B. Allyn and PACOM commander Harry B. Harris Jr. at Conmy Hall, Joint Base Myer-Henderson Hall, where he also received the Defense Distinguished Service Medal in recognition of his service to the country.

Controversy

In 2015, the Inspector General of the Department of Defense launched an investigation amid an allegation that Crutchfield misused government funds for his promotion ceremony to lieutenant general. The allegation was an anonymous report claiming that Crutchfield "invented a way to get a free plane ticket" to travel from PACOM headquarters in Hawaii to Fort Rucker solely for his promotion ceremony. It was found that Crutchfield spent $3,821.61 on a 7-day trip to Alabama en route to Washington, D.C. "to accommodate his preference to hold his promotion ceremony at Fort Rucker" rather than his duty station at Camp H. M. Smith, Hawaii. The trip in question included meetings with several Fort Rucker personnel and plans for a speaking engagement at Maxwell Air Force Base on the same day as the promotion ceremony. 

Crutchfield contested the findings, retorting that he was "not guilty of wasting government resources" and conducted official and "bona fide" activities on the 7-day trip. The Department of the Army eventually cleared Crutchfield of wrongdoing and allowed him to remain as PACOM deputy commander.

Post-retirement

Crutchfield joined Boeing as their vice president for army systems in July 2017. As VP - Army Systems, he is the company's senior liaison to the United States Army and is in charge of leading the development and execution of a strategic campus plan with United States Military Academy at West Point, including STEM (science, technology, engineering, and math) and diversity outreach programs.

Personal life

Crutchfield has been married to Kimberly “Kimmy” Crutchfield for 39 years and has 2 children and 3 grandchildren. He lives in New Kent, Virginia with his wife and two dogs.

Awards and decorations

References

External links

1960 births
Living people
Military personnel from Little Rock, Arkansas
Marshall University alumni
Webster University alumni
United States Army War College alumni
Recipients of the Defense Distinguished Service Medal
Recipients of the Defense Superior Service Medal
Recipients of the Legion of Merit
United States Army aviators
United States Army generals